The 2022–23 Moldovan Liga 2 is the 32nd season of Moldovan football's third-tier league. The season started on 13 August 2022 and will conclude on 27 May 2023. The league consists of two regional groups, Nord (North) and Sud (South).

North

Results
Teams will play each other twice (once home, once away).

South

Results
Teams will play each other twice (once home, once away).

References

External links
 Divizia B - Results, fixtures, tables and news - Soccerway

Moldovan Liga 2 seasons
Moldova 3
2022–23 in Moldovan football